The Quarta Catalana is the 9th and last tier of the Spanish football league system and the fourth highest league in the autonomous community of Catalonia. The league was formed in 2011 to replace the Tercera Territorial as third level of Catalonia and was split into 31 groups. Every season, depending on budgets, each group can have from 12 to 18 teams.

Structure 
Territorially, groups are divided as following:

Group 1 to 18 - Province of Barcelona
Group 19 and 20 - Terres de l'Ebre
Group 21 and 22 - Province of Lleida
Group 23 to 25 - Rest of the Province of Tarragona
Group 26 to 31 - Province of Girona

Groups (2021–22)

See also 
 Primera Catalana
 Segona Catalana
 Tercera Catalana
 Divisiones Regionales de Fútbol

References

Catalan football competitions
Quarta Catalana